Shushary is the name of several inhabited localities in Russia:
Urban localities
Shushary, Saint Petersburg, a municipal settlement in Pushkinsky District of the federal city of St. Petersburg

Rural localities
Shushary, Sverdlovsk Oblast, a village in Shalamovsky Selsoviet of Baykalovsky District in Sverdlovsk Oblast
Shushary, Republic of Tatarstan, a village in Vysokogorsky District of the Republic of Tatarstan